The Indonesian province of West Sulawesi (Provinsie Sulawesi Barat) is divided into six regencies, listed below with their areas and their populations at the 2010 and 2020 Censuses, together with the official estimates as at mid 2021. The most recently created regency is Central Mamuju Regency (Kabupaten Mamuju Tengah), which was cut out of the existing Mamuju Regency on 14 December 2012. North Mamuju Regency was renamed as Pasangkayu Regency in March 2018.

References